Brian Strutt (born 21 September 1959) is a Maltese former professional footballer who played as a striker.

Career
Strutt made two appearances in the Football League for Sheffield Wednesday in the 1979–80 season.

He later played non-league football for Matlock Town, before playing in New Zealand for Gisborne City, where he scored in the final of the 1987 Chatham Cup.

References

1959 births
Living people
Maltese footballers
Sheffield Wednesday F.C. players
Matlock Town F.C. players
English Football League players
Association football forwards